Teplička nad Váhom is a village and municipality in Žilina District in the Žilina Region of northern Slovakia.

History
In historical records the village was first mentioned in 1267. The village was the birthplace of the Hungarian noble Zsófia Bosnyák, who is the unofficial patron saint of Teplička nad Váhom.

Geography
The municipality lies at an altitude of 356 metres and covers an area of 10.880 km2. It has a population of about 4231 people.

External links
http://www.statistics.sk/mosmis/eng/run.html

Villages and municipalities in Žilina District